Schrankia vitiensis is a species of moth of the family Erebidae first described by Robinson in 1975. It is found on Fiji.

References

Moths described in 1975
Hypenodinae